An invasion is a military action of soldiers entering a foreign land.

Invasion may also refer to:

Film 
 Invasion (1966 film), a British film
 Invasión, a 1969 Argentine film
 Invasion, an alternate title for the 2005 direct-to-DVD film H. G. Wells' War of the Worlds by David Michael Latt
 The Invasion (film), a 2007 American film
 Invasion (2012 film), a German-Austrian film
 Invasion (2014 film), a Panamanian film
 Invasion (2017 film), an Iranian film
 Invasion (2020 film), a Russian film

Television
 Invasion (miniseries), a 1997 miniseries 
 Invasion (UK TV series), a 2001 BBC TV documentary
 Invasion (2005 TV series), a 2005 American television series
 Invasion (2021 TV series), a 2021 American television series

Episodes or Events
 "Invasion", fifth episode of the 1965 Doctor Who serial The Web Planet
 The Invasion (Doctor Who), an eight-part Doctor Who serial from 1968
 "Invasion", first episode of the 1974 Doctor Who serial Invasion of the Dinosaurs
 "Invasion" (Sliders), a 1996 episode of Sliders
 The Invasion (professional wrestling), a 2001 interpromotional professional wrestling storyline involving the WWF, WCW and ECW
 WWF Invasion, a 2001 WWF professional wrestling pay-per-view
 "Invasion" (CSI: Miami), a 2004 episode of CSI: Miami
 "Invasion" (Foyle's War), a 2006 episode of Foyle's War
 "Invasion" (Grey's Anatomy), a 2009 episode of Grey's Anatomy
 "Invasion!" (Arrowverse), a 2016 Arrowverse (Arrow/The Flash/Supergirl/Legends of Tomorrow) television crossover event, inspired by the DC Comics series

Literature and comics 
 Invader (novel), a 1995 science fiction novel by C. J. Cherryh
 Invasion (Cook novel), a 1997 novel by Robin Cook
 Invasion (Koontz novel), a 1975 novel by Dean Koontz
 Invasion (Harry novel), a 2000 novel by American author Eric L. Harry
 Invasion (Rhinehart novel), a 2016 novel by Luke Rhinehart.
 Invasion! (DC Comics), a 1989 DC Comics crossover event
 Invasion! (2000 AD), a series in early issues of the comic 2000 AD
 Invasion: How America Still Welcomes Terrorists, Criminals, and Other Foreign Menaces to Our Shores, a 2004 nonfiction book by Michelle Malkin

Music 
 "Invasion" (song), the first single off Combinations by the Texas band Eisley
 Invasion (Iron Maiden song), a 1979 song by Iron Maiden
 "Invasion", a song by Chumbawamba from Pictures of Starving Children Sell Records
 Invasion (Dragon Fli Empire album), 2005
 Invasion (Manilla Road album), 1980
 Invasion (Nastyboy), the first studio album by NB Ridaz
 Invasion (Upstairs), the second studio album by NB Ridaz
 Invasion (Savant album), 2015

Games 
 Invasion (Magic: The Gathering), an expansion to the Magic: The Gathering collectible card game
 Invasion, a strategy board game created by Dennis Wheatley and published in 1938
 Invasion, a strategy video game for the Magnavox Odyssey

See also
 Invasion U.S.A. (disambiguation)
 Invasion! (disambiguation)
 Inwazja ("Invasion"), a 2019 Polish television film
 Invader (disambiguation)
 The Invasion (disambiguation)